Concentration is an American television game show based on the children's memory game of the same name. It was created by Jack Barry and Dan Enright. The show featured contestants matching prizes represented by spaces on a game board, which would then reveal portions of a rebus puzzle underneath for the contestants to solve.

The show was broadcast on and off from 1958 to 1991, presented by various hosts, and has been made in several different versions. The original network daytime series, Concentration, appeared on NBC for 14 years, 7 months, and 3,770 telecasts (August 25, 1958 – March 23, 1973), the longest continuous run of any game show on that network. This series was hosted by Hugh Downs and later by Bob Clayton, but for a six-month period in 1969, Ed McMahon hosted the series. The series began at 11:30 am Eastern, then moved to 11:00 and finally to 10:30. Nearly all episodes of the NBC daytime version were produced at 30 Rockefeller Plaza, New York City.

A weekly nighttime version appeared in two separate broadcast runs: the first aired from October 30 to November 20, 1958, with Jack Barry as host, while the second ran from April 24 to September 18, 1961, with Downs as host. The second version of Concentration, the first to be made in Southern California, ran in syndication from September 10, 1973, to September 8, 1978, with Jack Narz as host. After some reformatting, a remake called Classic Concentration, hosted by Alex Trebek, ran on NBC from May 4, 1987, to September 20, 1991 (with reruns broadcast to January 14, 1994).

Development

Veteran game-show host Jack Barry and his producing partner Dan Enright, along with Robert Noah and Buddy Piper, created Concentration, but others working at Barry & Enright Productions also contributed to the show's development. The full end credit roll after the NBC takeover had a title that read "Based on a concept by Buddy Piper".

The creation involved the combination of two key creative concepts: the children's game of matching cards also known as concentration, and the use of a rebus puzzle that was revealed as matching cards were removed from the board. In place of the playing cards, the game board featured a board consisting of 30 "trilons", or three-sided motorized boxes, with numbers on the first of their three sides; prizes, that were to be matched, on the second; and "puzzle places" on the third. The gradual matching of card pairs slowly revealed elements of the rebus, a picture puzzle described below.

Rebuses

The rebus form is centuries old and has been used in various forms. The most popular contemporary form prior to Concentration involved pictures, letters and numbers as well as plus and minus signs to add or delete parts of a word or phrase. Norm Blumenthal developed the rebuses for the original series.

Rules
Two contestants (one usually a returning champion) sat before a board of 30 numbered squares. Each square was composed of a trilon that concealed a piece of the rebus, and either the name of a prize, or a special square.

One at a time, the contestants called out two numbers. If the prizes or special action did not match, the opponent took a turn. However, if the contestant did match, whatever prize was printed on the card was placed on a board behind the contestant; or, he/she could perform an action. The second number had to be called out within a certain time limit; otherwise, the contestant's turn ended. It was also permissible to pass on one's turn. This usually happened during the course of a game if a contestant called out a prize card that had been orphaned as the result of a wild card match (see below).

More importantly, a match also revealed two pieces of the rebus, which identified a person, phrase, place, thing, title, etc. The contestant could try to solve the rebus by making one guess or choose two more numbers. There was no penalty for a wrong guess; even if he/she was wrong, he/she kept control. Usually, a contestant waited to solve the puzzle until he/she had exposed a good portion of the rebus through several matches. In rare instances, the puzzle was solved with only a few clues showing: one contestant solved Night Court with two squares exposed and just the top of an apple core revealed.

Also included were two or three joke or gag prizes (such as a banana peel or a tattered sock). Over the years, the gag prizes included some creatively bad puns and wordplay. These actually served as protection against matching the forfeit cards upon which he/she might stumble.

Special squares
In addition to the prize cards, there were the following action cards:

 The Wild Card provided an automatic match. In the original game this left the natural match "orphaned," only able to be matched by the other Wild Card, of which there were only two on the board. If the contestant matched the same prize to both Wild Cards, a check mark was placed next to the prize on the contestant's board, and that contestant would win two of that prize if they solved the puzzle. Contestants uncovering both Wild Cards simultaneously also won a bonus that was theirs to keep regardless of the game's outcome. Originally, this was $500 but late in the run was changed to a new car.
 Take One Gift: Appeared on two cards in each game. If a contestant matched them, he/she could take his/her choice of any of the prizes listed on their opponent's prize board. Of course, the game had to be won to receive all prizes listed on his/her prize board.
 Forfeit One Gift: Appeared on six cards in each game. Any contestants who matched two of them had to forfeit one prize to their opponent.
 Bonus Number: Appeared on four cards in many games. If a contestant matched two of these cards and chose two numbers on a later turn that did not match, they were allowed to choose a third number. This was used only in the 1973–1978 syndicated edition hosted by Jack Narz.

Solving the puzzle
If a contestant solved the puzzle, he/she won all of his/her accumulated prizes. If there were no legitimate prizes in the rack, he/she was awarded $100. The loser forfeited all his/her gifts accumulated in that game, but still received token parting gifts as well as a copy of the show's home game. There was no bonus round in the original version of the show.

Occasionally, a game ended with only two prize cards left on the board, which because of the wild cards often did not match. In such instances, the unmatched cards were turned over to reveal the entire puzzle, and the contestant who made the last match was allowed one guess to try to solve it first. If he/she guessed incorrectly, his/her opponent was allowed to make one guess. If both guessed incorrectly, the game ended in a draw. A new game was played and each contestant was allowed to carry over a maximum of three prizes.

Occasionally, a game could not be completed due to time constraints. A sequential two-tone sound resembling a doorbell would be heard signaling time was up for that episode, and play was suspended. Play would resume at the start of the following episode with the board reset to the point where time was called. A new rebus puzzle was substituted and the prizes remained the same, but were behind different numbers.

Champions continued until they either were defeated or had won 20 games.

NBC (1958–1973)

Concentration remains the longest-running game show on NBC and held the record for longest continuous daytime run on network television until it was eclipsed in March 1987 by the CBS daytime version of The Price is Right (beginning September 4, 1972). Concentration is currently the fifth longest-running daytime/syndicated game show behind The Price Is Right and the syndicated versions of Wheel of Fortune (1983–present), Jeopardy! (1984–present), and Family Feud (1999–present).

Concentration was an NBC in-house production, apart from the earliest episodes. As a result of the 1950s quiz scandals, the network purchased the rights to Concentration and three other games (Twenty One, Dough Re Mi and Tic-Tac-Dough) from producers Barry and Enright. NBC/Universal still holds exclusive rights to both the format and extant episodes of Concentration; however, due to Financial Interest and Syndication Rules, this version is owned by CBS Media Ventures.

Concentrations original host was Hugh Downs. The show was produced and broadcast live at 11:30 am Eastern on weekdays in black-and-white, and quickly became the most-watched daytime series in NBC's lineup. The announcer was Art James, who sometimes served as a substitute host and later became a game show host in his own right. The series was produced in NBC's Studio 3A which now houses NBC News and MSNBC.

In 1958 and 1961, the show had two brief runs in prime time: one hosted by Jack Barry, the other by Downs.

The series then moved to 11:00 am and slowly introduced color broadcasts. For a picture puzzle game whose rebuses were designed and painted in monochrome, this required some design changes: The colors of the numbered cards might otherwise interfere with the colors used on the rebus, a critical issue for contestants playing in the studio and for viewers who played along at home. During this period, the series was produced in NBC's Studio 6A. Hugh Downs, by this time also an anchor correspondent on NBC's Today Show, remained host, and the announcer became Jim Lucas, who also worked on NBC's local New York radio station, WNBC (AM). In September 1965, the show moved to 10:30 am where it would spend the remainder of its run on NBC.

In January 1969, Downs stepped down to devote his entire attention to Today. Bob Clayton, who had succeeded Jim Lucas as announcer, took over the hosting duties; he was introduced as the new host at the program's 1968 Christmas episode, dressed as Santa Claus. NBC staffer Wayne Howell moved to the announcer's booth during Clayton's tenure as host. However, in March, advertiser pressure led NBC to set Clayton aside in favor of Ed McMahon; after viewer complaints and declining ratings, Clayton returned in September and remained host until the series ended on March 23, 1973. (On the Monday following Concentration'''s cancellation, Clayton became the announcer for The $10,000 Pyramid on CBS.)

Special features
Seen daily for nearly 15 years, and consistently one of the most popular series on NBC, the original series included many special features. Among the series' popular special features:

 The Envelope and its Mysterious Contents — The winning contestant opened a sealed envelope and read its message aloud (as if he/she were the show announcer). Generally, it mentioned an inexpensive prize and further reading proved it to be an expensive prize, such as large amount of cash or a new car.
 The Cash Wheel — A contestant spun a carnival wheel containing various dollar amounts with a top prize of $2,000.
 Christmas shows featured children from United Nations countries. Secret Santas included Joe Garagiola, Victor Borge, and other celebrities. Proceeds went to C.A.R.E., which built two schools in Africa from funds raised by the series (Blumenthal and Downs received awards from the organization for the proceeds).
 International Salutes – All prizes in these games were from the specific country saluted. For example, a salute to Mexico had contestants wearing sombreros, Downs dressed as a matador, and model Paola Diva playing a colorfully costumed señorita driving a mule-driven cart.
 An annual Boy Scout Show, saluting famous Americans who were scouts. Den Mothers and Scouts played the game and won prizes for themselves and their troops. Girl Scout shows also became an annual event.
 The Challenge Of Champions – Beginning in 1963, Concentration inaugurated a tournament of champions, which pitted the top four contestants of the previous 12 months in a best-of-seven tournament (styled in a tournament similar to the World Series). The grand prize was $1,000, a trip around the world and a special trophy dubbed "The Connie", modeled after Auguste Rodin's The Thinker. One of the participants in the very first tournament was Brooklyn Dodgers pitcher Ralph Branca, who won 17 games on the show.

Throughout the competition, participants, including Downs, Clayton, and Blumenthal, wore blue blazers with the show's logo embroidered in gold on the breast pocket, a surrealistic amalgamation of all thirteen letters in the word "Concentration"; this was known as the "Mystery Logo".  The logo and the blazers continued to be a part of the host's wardrobe until the network version of the show ended in 1973.  The logo was not used in the syndicated version of the show (1973–78).

During another contest (c. 1970), home viewers could win a prize based on the initial of their last names corresponding to a number on the board. To enter the contest, one merely had to send a postcard to the address given. These postcards were placed in a rotary drum and Clayton would draw a card and read the name. If the prize card was for a gag prize or "Forfeit 1 Gift", the home viewer received $100. If it was "Take 1 Gift", a $250 prize was awarded. If it happened to be a Wild Card, the home viewer won $500. The contest was held at least once a week, and frequently with several drawings per show.

Through nearly all of the original series' run, the program was produced by Norm Blumenthal. He not only created every one of the 7,300 puzzles used on the show (with no repeated puzzles), but also every puzzle utilized in all 24 editions of the Milton Bradley home game.

Prizes
The prize values on the original series were deliberately much smaller than those of Barry and Enright's other games, especially the big-money games (not just their own) implicated as part of the 1950s quiz show scandals. The winnings were kept at a low amount on purpose to avoid any suggestion that it was also tainted. When the network took over production shortly after the series began in 1958, NBC maintained this policy, although this may have been for reasons unrelated to the scandals.

Usually, there was at least one prize worth more than $1,000. However, nearly all the other prizes were worth less than $500, with many in the $10–$100 range. A board of prizes rarely totaled more than $2,000–$3,000 and champions rarely took home more than that in merchandise during their stay (though some longer-reigning champions approached $10,000).

Additionally, there were countless gift certificates, travel trailers, airplanes, swimming pools, furniture, kitchen appliances (large and small), rooms of furniture, clothing, stereos and televisions, fantastic nights out on the town and virtually any other item seen in any mail-order catalog. One history of the original NBC version reported the total prize giveaway at $10,000,000.

Cancellation
For most of its run, Concentration faced sitcom reruns on CBS and local programming on ABC affiliates, easily dominating them in the ratings. However, in September 1972, CBS launched The New Price Is Right at 10:30/9:30 and drained off more than half of the Concentration audience. Rather than move the game, NBC concluded that it had reached the end of its life and cancelled it in March 1973.

While the first puzzle on the debut was "It Happened One Night", the last puzzle on the finale was "You've Been More Than Kind". After Clayton said a final goodbye, the credits rolled over a rendition of "Auld Lang Syne".Baffle, a Merrill Heatter-Bob Quigley production hosted by Dick Enberg, replaced it at that time slot and ran until March 29, 1974.

Syndication (1973–1978)
Five months after NBC canceled Concentration, the network called upon Mark Goodson-Bill Todman Productions to produce a new edition of the series for syndication. This marked the first time Goodson-Todman was asked to produce a format owned by another production company; each of their previous productions were conceived by people on their own staff.

The new syndicated Concentration premiered on September 10, 1973, and ran for five years. Jack Narz was host, with Johnny Olson serving as announcer. This version of Concentration was produced at Metromedia Square in Hollywood, and aired primarily on NBC stations that had carried the original series. It was produced as a daily series but at the time, many game shows aired once per week in syndication and some stations airing Concentration aired it in this manner as well.

Rules
Two new contestants competed each day, with no returning champions; and games did not straddle episodes as on the network version (as some affiliates only broadcast the program one evening a week). For the first two years, the basic game was identical to the NBC version with the addition of four "head starts" that revealed half the locations of four prizes on the board. In addition, the gag prizes disappeared and only one pair of "Forfeit 1 Gift" cards remained; three pairs of "Take 1 Gift" cards were hidden on the board.Concentrations new board had become very colorful. The 30 numbers (now larger) were in red with yellow backgrounds and red frames and the mechanical trilons turned a little faster than in the NBC version.  Many prize, Forfeit, Take, and Wild Card spaces had actually come from New York with the original board and were reverse-printed (white lettering on a black background). The rebus was in full color on a sky blue background.

The cash prize if a contestant solved the puzzle with no prizes on his/her side of the board was increased from $100 to $250. The bonus for calling two Wild Cards on the same turn reverted to $500 as opposed to a new car as last offered by NBC; the bonus was once again theirs to keep regardless of the game's outcome. In addition, unlike in the original NBC version, the contestant no longer received the opportunity to match the wild card spaces and reveal four parts of the puzzle. While the same types of merchandise prizes were available, the syndicated series also featured prizes that would normally be consolation prizes on other shows (such as supplies of Rice-A-Roni or Bon Ami cleanser).

The first player to solve the rebus played the Double Play bonus round. If there were no more matching pairs left on the board, or if time was running short, the remaining boxes were turned over and the complete rebus revealed. The first player to buzz in with the correct solution won the game. If neither player solved the rebus, the Double Play round was not played for that particular game.

Later, four "Bonus Number" cards (eliminating one prize pair and one of the "Take 1 Gift" pairs) appeared during each game. If a contestant matched two Bonus Number cards or combined one with a wild card, then the next time they selected two numbers which failed to match, they were permitted to select a third number. If a match was made, the unmatched number would be turned back over unless it was a Wild Card.

If time permitted, a third game was played. This time, the object was to match amounts of foreign currency and no head starts were given. All of the special squares (Take 1 Gift, Bonus Number, Wild Card, etc.) remained on the board for this game. The first player to solve the rebus won $100 plus the amount of their currency matches in American dollars, and if time ran out during the game the same rules as noted above applied.

Beginning in the fall of 1975 and continuing through the spring of 1976, a series of changes were implemented to speed up game play. The "Forfeit 1 Gift" cards were removed from play and two more Wild Cards were added to the board, with the prize for matching them reduced to $250. The first game of each episode became a "Three-Call" game, in which a contestant who failed to make a match with his/her first two picks was allowed to call a third number. If this third pick was a Wild Card, the contestant could match it to either of the two already-revealed prizes. The Three-Call rule was later implemented in the second game as well. In addition, two "Free Look" spaces were added to the board during the first game; if one was uncovered, the contestant saw the piece of the puzzle behind it and got a free guess without having to match cards. All of the remaining original trilon cards were scrapped and replaced with new graphics. The rebuses were also made shorter and easier.

Double Play
The Double Play round was the first bonus round played on a Concentration series. The round was usually played twice per episode.

The winner of each game was tasked with solving two rebuses within ten seconds. After the audience and the viewers were shown the solution to the first rebus, the puzzle was shown to the contestant. If he/she solved it, the contestant won $100 and the clock stopped while the second rebus was set in place. The process then repeated itself, with the contestant needing to solve the second rebus before the clock hit zero. Doing so won a prize, which for the first four seasons was a new car. For the final season, a nine square board was used to determine the contestant's potential prize(s). The car, along with three other prize packages, were available to choose from and the first prize the contestant matched was the reward for winning the round. The ninth space on the board concealed a wild card, which automatically matched any revealed prize(s) chosen before it; this allowed the contestant to play for more than one prize if there was more than one displayed on the board when the wild card came up.

If there was time left in the show for another round but not enough time to play the third game with the money amounts described above, a third Double Play round was played. Two rebuses were played, with each contestant playing one, and solving a rebus within ten seconds won the player that did so an extra $50.

The music for a Double Play win was later used on The Price Is Right during prize descriptions of a car. Many other cues from The Price Is Right were used on Concentration as well, including music used for the head starts and Double Play prize descriptions.

Cancellation

Despite these changes, the show's ratings fell and many stations (including former flagship WNBC in New York) moved the show to either pre-dawn hours or other non-prime time access slots and dropped it in spring 1976. Some independent stations then picked up the show for its final two years.

On September 8, 1978, the second version of Concentration aired its final episode and left the airwaves, with the exception of several markets who opted to air reruns for an entire season until fall 1979.

Buzzr
On March 6, 2020, Buzzr announced that reruns of the Narz version, starting with 1976 episodes, would air on their network starting on March 30.

Classic Concentration (1987–1991)

In January 1987, Mark Goodson Productions sought permission from NBC to relaunch Concentration.  The new series, which became known as Classic Concentration, debuted on NBC on May 4, 1987. Production was now done at NBC Studios in Burbank, California. Alex Trebek (who concurrently was also hosting Jeopardy!) hosted and Diana Taylor was the series' prize model. On July 22 of that year, Mark Goodson's daughter, Marjorie Goodson-Cutt, replaced Taylor and remained for the entire series. Gene Wood was the announcer, with Art James substituting for him for several weeks in 1991. The new Concentration ran once again at 10:30 am EST and remained in that slot for its entire run. Classic Concentrations final new episode aired on September 20, 1991, but reruns continued to air on NBC from October 28, 1991 until December 31, 1993.

Gameplay

Main game
This version featured a computer-generated game board with contestants viewing on a large-screen TV placed off stage.  The number of squares on the board was reduced from 30 in the previous versions to 25.

Each game used one to three Wild Cards. Choosing two Wilds in one turn credits the contestant a $500 bonus, and if the third was chosen in the same turn the bonus doubled to $1,000. During a Twins Week on November 13, 1989, a second cash bonus was added to the board with the introduction of the "Cash Pot", a progressive jackpot that started at $500 and increased by $100 each game it was not won. As with any other prize on the puzzle board, cash bonuses could only be won if the contestant solved the rebus. When a Wild Card match was made, the natural match was also shown, resulting in three puzzle parts being revealed (or more if multiple Wilds were found in one turn). The contestant who correctly solved the puzzle won the game and kept whatever prizes he/she matched to that point.

In the earliest episodes there were no "Take 1 Gift" cards on the board. On November 4, 1987, two green "TAKE!" squares were added; upon matching these, a contestant received a card that could be used to steal one prize from the opponent's column. On February 2, 1988, two red "TAKE!" squares were put into play. In order to claim a "TAKE!" card, a contestant now had to match two squares of the same color. Unlike in previous versions of Concentration, a contestant did not have to use a card immediately after claiming it, but could wait and steal a desired prize after making a match at any later time during the round. However, unused cards did not carry over from round to round. The "Forfeit 1 Gift" cards from the previous versions were never used in the "Classic" version, having been eliminated for good during the previous syndicated series.

In the event time ran short during a game, any remaining prizes, Wild Cards and unclaimed/unused "TAKE!" cards were taken out of play and the puzzle was revealed one square at a time, in numerical order. The first contestant to buzz-in with a correct solution won the game. If incorrect, the contestant was locked out and the rest of the puzzle was revealed for the opponent to receive a free guess. If both contestants were incorrect and/or offered no guess, either of them could buzz in after Trebek began describing the puzzle, giving clues to the solution of the puzzle until one contestant guessed correctly.

Bonus round
The bonus round, dubbed the "Winner's Circle", was played for one of eight cars that were displayed in the studio. The contestant was shown a board of 15 numbered panels, behind which seven of the eight cars had matching pairs; the eighth was always used as a decoy. Contestants were given a base time of 35 seconds to play the round, with five seconds added for each time the round was not won. If a contestant made all seven matches before time ran out, they won the last car matched. Each time a car was won, the clock was reset to 35 seconds for the next round. On June 29, 1990, the format of the clock was changed so that new champions were given a base time of 35 seconds and were given an additional five seconds for each return to the bonus round until they won a car.

Early in the show's run, a contestant could win the game and play the bonus round up to five times before being retired. Beginning on December 30, 1987, contestants were retired undefeated only after winning one car. From the premiere to June 28, 1990, contestants could win up to five matches.

Occasionally, "Five Bonus Car Seconds" was a prize appearing in the main game. Any contestant who had matched this prize and solved the puzzle earned five additional seconds in their next attempt at the bonus round.

Returning champions
In the beginning of the run, each match consisted of one game with the winner advancing to the bonus round. A losing contestant left with parting gifts except if their game was interrupted, in which case he/she would return for the first game on the next show.

On July 5, 1988, the show experimented with a best two-out-of-three match format during their special summer college student week, with the first contestant to solve two puzzles winning the match and playing the bonus round; the format became permanent on August 9, 1988.  Unlike most game shows whose episodes tended to straddle playing a best two-out-of-three match, Classic Concentration had each match and bonus round fit into one complete episode. The first game was split over the first two segments, with the second and/or third game (if needed) taking up the third, and the bonus round played during the fourth.

From June 29, 1990 until the series finale, the game was changed once more to a "two-strike" format in which contestants were allowed to keep playing until they either won a car or lost two games, whichever came first. With this format, the show went back to playing the main game and the bonus round twice each day. In each half of the show, whichever contestant solved the puzzle went on to the bonus round while their opponent received a "strike" on a small box on top of his/her contestant podium (an illuminated gold square with a black X in the middle). If a contestant got two strikes (lost two games), they were eliminated from the game completely, but they still got to keep whatever cash and/or prizes they won up to that point, if any. This format was previously used briefly from March 15, 1988 to August 8, 1988.

Audience Game
If there was time remaining during some shows, an audience member preselected before taping began played the bonus round for up to $500. Instead of the names of cars, dollar amounts of $5, $10, $15, $20, $25, $50, $75, and $100 were hidden behind the 15 numbers. The audience member was given 60 seconds and kept the total of all amounts matched, or $500 for clearing the board.

Tournament of Champions
For two consecutive years (April 1989 and November 1990, respectively), Classic Concentration held a week-long tournament of champions involving ten contestants who won cars in the fastest times of all the contestants who appeared on the show during each calendar year. They returned to compete for additional prizes on top of what they already won in their original appearances, as well as a second new car and a large cash bonus ($25,000 in the first tournament and $10,000 in the second). In both tournaments, each episode featured two different contestants that played for the entire half-hour. The main game was played the same way as it normally was, but the bonus round was played differently.

In the 1989 tournament, since the game was played as a best two-out-of-three match, the winner of each day's game played the bonus round with the clock counting upwards from zero until he/she matched up the seven paired cars on the board. The contestant who completed the bonus round in the shortest length of time won the tournament and $25,000, and all contestants who made seven matches within 45 seconds won the last car they matched.

However, the 1990 tournament operated slightly differently due to the two-strike format (the strikes did not count during the tournament). The first contestant to play the bonus round during that week tried to make all seven matches as quickly as possible, with the clock counting upward from zero; for all subsequent bonus rounds, the clock counted down from that time. If a contestant completed the round in a shorter time, his/her result became the new time to beat. Only the contestant who posted the shortest time over the entire week won the car he/she had matched last and the $10,000.

In each tournament, all ten contestants got to keep whatever cash and/or prizes they won in the main game, regardless of who won the tournament.

Home games
The Milton Bradley Company introduced the first commercial version of Concentration in 1958 and subsequently released 24 editions of the game until 1982. Owing to common superstition, these releases were numbered 1–12 and 14–25, skipping 13. It was tied with Password as the most prolific of Milton Bradley's home versions of popular game shows, and was produced well after the Jack Narz era ended in 1978 (albeit without ever including elements from that version).

Pressman Games published two editions of the Classic Concentration home game in 1988. More recently, Endless Games has released two versions of Concentration since 1998. The Endless version were modeled similar to Classic Concentration home game with the rebuses designed by Steve Ryan, who created puzzles for Classic Concentration.

Two computer versions of Classic Concentration were released by Softie for MS-DOS systems, as well as the Apple II and Commodore 64. A Nintendo Entertainment System version was also released by GameTek. Tiger Electronics also marketed a hand-held version of the game in 1999 using the Narz-era theme and the 1960s–1978 logo.

There were also books based on the TV shows. Three issues for the original were released in 1971, written and designed by Norman Blumenthal. Each issue of this collection featured 36 rebus puzzles, 30 standard and six "super puzzles".

In 1991, the book Classic Concentration: The Game, The Show, The Puzzles, written by the show's puzzle designer Steve Ryan (and plugged on the air), was released. The book features 152 puzzles that were used on the show; the first 48 puzzles are exposed in their entirety, whereas the remaining 104 are first presented partially revealed on one page, then fully revealed on the next, with all puzzle solutions featured in the back of the book. The book also features a detailed history of Concentration and an introduction by executive producer Mark Goodson.

A video slot machine based on the 1958–1973 version was released for American casinos by Bally Gaming Systems.

In 2007, Reflexive Arcade released a downloadable version of Concentration based on the Classic Concentration format and bonus round with newer puzzles and prizes. In 2008, Glu Mobile released a mobile version of Concentration based on the PC downloadable version, with the look of the original 1958–1973 series.

Episode status
Some kinescope recordings of the 1958–1973 version are held at the Library of Congress. Shokus Video (a service specializing primarily in public domain offerings) offers a Hugh Downs-hosted tournament episode from 1967.

Buzzr currently airs episodes of Classic Concentration and, since March 30, 2020, episodes of the 1970s syndicated version, starting from episodes from 1976.

International versionsConcentration is one of only three Barry-Enright game shows known to have foreign adaptations, the others being Tic-Tac-Dough and Twenty-One''.

References

External links

 Concentration (1958) at IMDb
 Concentration (1973) at IMDb
 Classic Concentration at IMDb

NBC original programming
First-run syndicated television programs in the United States
1950s American game shows
1960s American game shows
1970s American game shows
1980s American game shows
1990s American game shows
1958 American television series debuts
1978 American television series endings
1987 American television series debuts
1991 American television series endings
Television series by Barry & Enright Productions
Television series by Mark Goodson-Bill Todman Productions
Television series by CBS Studios
Television series by Universal Television
American television series revived after cancellation
Black-and-white American television shows
English-language television shows
Memory games
Television shows based on card games